Jörg Naumann (born 2 January 1963) is a German former track and field hurdler who competed for East Germany. He was a bronze medallist at the 1985 IAAF World Cup, helping the East German men to third in the team competition. He won the 60 metres indoor national title at the East German Indoor Athletics Championships in 1982.

International competitions

National titles
East German Indoor Athletics Championships
60 m hurdles: 1982

References

Living people
1963 births
East German male hurdlers
German male hurdlers